Slater Cigar Company is two historic cigar factory and tobacco warehouse buildings located at Lancaster, Lancaster County, Pennsylvania. The building at 625 Columbia Avenue was built about 1895, and is a three-story, rectangular brick building with a high basement. It is 90 feet wide by 30 feet deep and has a flat roof. The building at 626–628 Columbia Avenue was built in 1905–1906, and is a four-story, rectangular brick building with a high basement. It is 45 feet wide by 140 feet deep. A one-story brick addition was built about 1923.

It was listed on the National Register of Historic Places in 1990.

References

Industrial buildings and structures on the National Register of Historic Places in Pennsylvania
Industrial buildings completed in 1895
Industrial buildings completed in 1906
Buildings and structures in Lancaster, Pennsylvania
Historic cigar factories
Tobacco buildings in the United States
National Register of Historic Places in Lancaster, Pennsylvania
1906 establishments in Pennsylvania